Branislav Rajačić (21 November 1931 – 30 September 1992) was a Serbian professional basketball coach and administrator.

See also 
 List of KK Partizan head coaches

References

1931 births
1992 deaths
KK Partizan coaches
OKK Beograd coaches
KK Dinamo Pančevo coaches
KK Železničar Beograd coaches
Serbian men's basketball coaches
Basketball players from Sarajevo
Yugoslav basketball coaches
Serbs of Bosnia and Herzegovina